Hellespontophylakes ("Guards of the Hellespont") in Classical Greece were Athenian grain officials controlling the passage of grain from the Euxine Sea (Black Sea) to the Aegean and Athens. Using the might of the Athenian navy, they could deny every and any other state's access to the Euxine Sea.

References

Feeding the democracy: the Athenian grain supply in the fifth and fourth century Page 335   (2007)

Ancient Athenian titles
Ancient Greek Thrace
Athenian Empire
History of the Dardanelles